Dewey Arthur Bohling (born August 22, 1938 in Athens, Ohio) is a former college and professional American football player.  A halfback, he played college football at Hardin–Simmons University, and played professionally in the American Football League (AFL) for the New York Titans and the Buffalo Bills between the 1960 and 1961.

See also
 List of American Football League players

1938 births
Living people
American football running backs
Buffalo Bills players
Hardin–Simmons Cowboys football players
New York Titans (AFL) players
People from Athens, Ohio
Players of American football from Ohio
American Football League players